Outpost may refer to:

Places 
 Outpost (military), a detachment of troops stationed at a distance from the main force or formation, usually at a station in a remote or sparsely populated location
 Border outpost, an outpost maintained by a sovereign state on its border, usually one of a series placed at regular intervals, to watch over and safeguard its border with a neighboring state
 Human outpost, an artificially-created, controlled human habitat located in an environment inhospitable for humans, such as the ocean floor, the Antarctic, in space, or on another planet
 Outpost Estates, Los Angeles, California, a canyon neighborhood
 Outpost Islands, Nunavut, Canada
 Israeli outpost, a settlement built on land that was not legally purchased and was not given a building permit by the State of Israel

Entertainment 
 The Outpost, a 1909 play written by James Francis Jewell Archibald
 Outpost (board game), from TimJim games
 Outpost (chess), a strategic element in chess
 Outpost Gallifrey, a Doctor Who fan website
 The Outpost (Resnick novel), a 2001 science fiction novel by Mike Resnick
 The Outpost (Prus novel), by Bolesław Prus
 Outpost Records, a former Geffen Records imprint
The Outpost (TV series), a 2018 fantasy TV series
The Outpost: An Untold Story of American Valor, a book by Jake Tapper
"The Outpost" is Episode 23 of Freeform's 2018 drama show Siren

Music
 Outpost (The Samples album), 1996
 Outpost (Robert Rich and Ian Boddy album), 2002
 Outpost (Freddie Hubbard album), 1981
 Outpost (Buckethead album), 2014
 The Outpost (opera), a 1900 short opera by Hamilton Clarke, played as a companion piece for The Pirates of Penzance

Films
 Outpost (1944 film), 1944 animated film
 Outpost (1959 film), an Australian television play
 Outpost (2008 film), a 2008 horror film directed by Steve Barker
 The Outpost (1995 film), a Hungarian film
 The Outpost, another name for the 1995 film The Hills Have Eyes III
 The Outpost (2020 film), a 2020 war drama film based on the book The Outpost: An Untold Story of American Valor by Jake Tapper, about the Battle of Kamdesh in the war in Afghanistan.

Video games
 Outpost (1981 video game) for the Apple II
 Outpost (1994 video game) published by Sierra On-Line
 Outpost 2 (1997) 
 Outpost Kaloki X, a city-building video game for the Xbox 360

Other uses 
 Cyberian Outpost, an online vendor of discount computerware
 Outpost Magazine, a Canadian adventure-travel publication
 Lunar outpost (NASA), a planned, Moon-based inhabited facility 
 Outpost Firewall Pro, a software package
 Outpost for Hope, a missing persons website
 Outpost Harry, a remote Korean War military base
 Outpost Island Mine, a gold mine in Canada
 Outpost Snipe, a remote World War II military located Egypt
 Outpost Societies, secret, early 20th century Istanbul societal organizations
 Outposts of tyranny, a term used in 2005 to characterize some governments
 Outpost.com, a name formerly used by Fry's Electronics

See also
 The Last Outpost (disambiguation)
 Southern Outpost, a record label